Polyprenylpyrophosphate synthetase may refer to:
 All-trans-octaprenyl-diphosphate synthase, an enzyme
 All-trans-decaprenyl-diphosphate synthase, an enzyme